Pamela Rae French (née Satterthwaite, born 26 December 1937) is a former New Zealand fencer who won a bronze medal for her country at the 1966 British Empire and Commonwealth Games.

Biography
French was born in Takapuna on 26 December 1937, the daughter of Eileen Daphne Satterthwaite (née White) and Thomas Satterthwaite of Putāruru. As an adult, she became a pharmacist, and married Terence Edward French.

At the 1963 New Zealand national fencing championships, she won the women's foil title. In 1965, she was a member of the New Zealand team that competed against Australia. The following year, she represented New Zealand in the women's individual and team foil events at the 1966 British Empire and Commonwealth Games in Kingston, Jamaica. Alongside Gaye McDermit and Joyce Fenton, she won a bronze medal in the team foils. However, in the individual foil, she did not progress to the final pool stage.

References

External links
 

1937 births
Living people
Sportspeople from Auckland
New Zealand female foil fencers
Fencers at the 1966 British Empire and Commonwealth Games
Commonwealth Games bronze medallists for New Zealand
Commonwealth Games medallists in fencing
People from Takapuna
Medallists at the 1966 British Empire and Commonwealth Games